Javier Díaz Dueñas (born 26 September 1951 in Mexico City), is a Mexican actor and director.

Filmography

Film

Television

References

External links 

1951 births
Mexican male telenovela actors
Male actors from Mexico City
20th-century Mexican male actors
21st-century Mexican male actors
Living people